Magyar Úszó Egylet or shortly MÚE is a Hungarian football and sport club from the town of Budapest, Hungary.

History
It was one of the first football clubs opened in Hungary, having opened its football section in 1898. Magyar Úszó Egylet debuted in the 1901 season of the Hungarian League and finished seventh.

Name changes 
1893-?: Magyar Úszó Egylet
?-1945: Magyar Úszó Egyesület
1945-1948: Magyar Munkás Úszó Egyesület

Honours
Hungarian League
 Runners-up (1): 1901

External links
 Profile

References

defunct football clubs in Hungary
association football clubs established in 1893
1893 establishments in Hungary
association football clubs disestablished in 1948